Sky trooper or variation, may refer to:

 Paratrooper, a soldier who drops from the sky
 Smokejumper, a firefighter who drops from the sky
 Douglas C-53 Skytrooper, a troop transport airplane also used for airborne deployment
 Sky Trooper, a 1942 Disney cartoon WWII propaganda film starring Donald Duck
 Space marine, a fictional sky-based soldier

See also

 Parachutist
 Spacetrooper
 
 
 Trooper (disambiguation)
 Sky (disambiguation)
 Starship Troopers (disambiguation)
 Paratrooper (disambiguation)
 Skydiver (disambiguation)